Sadame Kamakura (April 27, 1930 – October 25, 2014) was Grand Steward of the Imperial Household Agency (January 19, 1996 – April 2, 2001). He graduated from the University of Tokyo. He was a recipient of the Order of the Sacred Treasure.

References

1930 births
2014 deaths
Recipients of the Order of the Sacred Treasure, 1st class
University of Tokyo alumni
People from Kōchi Prefecture